A Taverna is a place serving Greek cuisine.

Taverna may also refer to:

People 
 Ferdinando Taverna (1558–1619), Italian cardinal
 Ludovico Taverna (1535–1617), Italian diplomat and bishop of Lodi
 Paola Taverna (born 1969), Italian politician

Places 
 Taverna, Calabria, a small town in the Province of Catanzaro, Italy
 Palazzo Taverna (disambiguation)

Software 
 taveRNA, a software suite for nucleic acids
 Apache Taverna, an open source workflow management system

See also
 Tavern, an establishment serving food and alcoholic beverages
 Trevena (disambiguation)